The inaugural Ndayishimiye Cabinet was formed by President of Burundi Évariste Ndayishimiye on 28 June 2020. Ndayishimiye took over as president of Burundi in June 2020 following the electoral win in the 2020 Burundian general election and the death of former president Pierre Nkurunziza.

First Term

Inaugural Cabinet 
In his first cabinet, Ndayishimiye nominated 16 Ministers, of which 5 were women.

References

External links 

 Official President Website
 National Assembly of Burundi
 Council of Ministers

Cabinets established in 2020
Current governments
2020 establishments in Africa
Government of Burundi